The Temple University James E. Beasley School of Law is the law school of Temple University in Philadelphia, Pennsylvania. It was founded in 1895 and enrolls about 530 students.

Student body
Admission for fall 2019 entering class was highly competitive, with 232 applicants being enrolled from a pool of 2,350. The median GPA was 3.56 and the median LSAT score was 161. The 25th/75th percentile of entrants had GPAs of 3.28/3.72, and LSAT scores of 158/163. The class represented 113 different colleges, and came from 32 states and countries. Women were 49% of the class, 34% were students of color, and the average age was 26.

Faculty
Temple Law School employs 68 full-time faculty members and retains numerous local attorneys as adjuncts. The faculty is well balanced and diverse. Gregory N. Mandel, a noted intellectual property law scholar, was named dean in May 2017. JoAnne A. Epps, a professor at Temple Law since 1985, was dean from 2008 to 2016, when she was appointed provost of Temple University. Robert J. Reinstein was dean of the law school from 1989 to 2008.

Specialized coursework
Integrated Trial Advocacy Program (ITAP)
Integrated Transactional Program (ITP)
The Law & Public Policy Program

Study abroad programs
Temple Law School offers two study abroad programs that are open to students from any ABA approved law school: the summer session in Rome and the spring semester in Tokyo (at Temple University Japan). The Tokyo program is perhaps the most notable, as it is the only ABA-accredited semester program for law students in Japan.

Additionally, Temple JD students are eligible to study at the following partner institutions: Tsinghua University, University College Cork, Tel Aviv University, Utrecht University, Jindal Global Law School, University of Lucerne, InterAmerican University, Bocconi University, and University of Muenster.

Study abroad credits from any program can be used toward the J.D. program or the joint JD/LL.M. in Transnational Law.

Graduate law programs (LL.M., S.J.D., Certificate, Teaching Fellowship)
The Law School offers several advanced degree programs, including Master of Laws Degree (LL.M.) in trial advocacy, transnational law, Asian law and taxation. Certificate programs in estate planning and employee benefits are offered through the taxation program. International lawyers have the opportunity to design their own curriculum through Temple's General LL.M. program. In addition to the LL.M., Temple offers an advanced degree for aspiring scholars, the Doctor of Juridical Science (S.J.D.), and a Graduate Teaching Fellowship program.

LL.M. in trial advocacy
LL.M. in transnational law
LL.M. in taxation

The Graduate Tax Program is designed to provide understanding of complex taxation issues. The program provides candidates with a strong foundation in tax law, as well as the opportunity to develop expertise beyond the level of study offered in J.D. programs. A degree candidate must satisfactorily complete 24 credit hours of course work, including all core curriculum requirements and a writing seminar. Candidates may study on a full-time or part-time basis and all coursework must be completed within four years of matriculation. Applicants must have satisfactorily completed a basic income tax course in law school or demonstrated comparable work experience. An applicant who cannot meet this requirement must take the basic course in taxation offered in Temple's J.D. program in the student's first term after admission to the LL.M. program.

LL.M. in Asian law
Temple's LL.M. in Asian law is designed for J.D. holders and students who wish to focus on the law of Asian countries, particularly China, Japan and India, the more powerful economies of the region. Students complete the first of two semesters at the Philadelphia campus, taking foundational courses such as Chinese law, Japanese law and law in Asia. Students are then required to spend the second semester at one of either Temple University Japan in Tokyo, Jindal Global Law School in the National Capital Region (Delhi) of India, or Tsinghua University Law School in Beijing, China. Students must maintain a G.P.A. of at least 2.50 (out of 4.0) over the course of the 24 credits they must earn to graduate.

General LL.M. for international lawyers
Temple offers a general studies LL.M. program for foreign-trained lawyers. With the exception of two required research and writing courses, students can design their own curriculum from more than 180 courses offered annually in American and international law. General LL.M. degree candidates must successfully complete 24 credit hours of course work with a cumulative grade point average of 2.0 (out of a possible 4.0). The program can be completed in two semesters beginning in August and continuing to May. In addition to the main campus in Philadelphia, the General LL.M. is offered in Tokyo and Beijing. Students may transfer up to four credits at Temple's six-week summer law program in Rome, Italy, to the main campus L.L.M.

Doctor of Juridical Science
The Doctor of Juridical Science is a research-oriented degree program designed for those seeking to pursue careers as law teachers and scholars of law. Candidates enrolled in the S.J.D. program are required to spend their initial academic year in residence at the main campus in Philadelphia.

Estate planning and employee benefits certificates
An Estate Planning Certificate and Employee Benefits Certificate is offered through the Graduate Tax Program for practitioners who do not wish to pursue an LL.M. degree. The Estate Planning Certificate (exposes students to federal estate, gift and generation-skipping taxation issues, as well as federal income taxation of trusts and estates.

Law School organizations

Moot Court

Temple Law's Moot Court was started in the 1950s. Moot Court members are selected as second-year law students through the Samuel L. Polsky Selection Competition, which is held during the fall semester. Polsky participants research and write an appellate brief, then argue both sides of the case before experienced attorneys who serve as appellate court justices. Students receiving the highest scores for brief writing and oral argument are invited to join the society.

Law journals
Temple Law has two student-edited journals and law reviews. The Temple Law Review is published quarterly and the Temple International and Comparative Law Journal is published on a bi-annual basis.

Employment statistics
According to 2021 U.S. News & World Report, 59.8% of the graduating class obtained jobs at graduation, 83.3 acquired jobs in 10 months after graduation. Temple's Law School Transparency under-employment score is 16.3%, indicating the percentage of the Class of 2016 unemployed, pursuing an additional degree, or working in a non-professional, short-term, or part-time job ten months after graduation.

Rankings and recognition
 U.S. News ranks Temple Law the 63rd best law school in the country in its 2023 law school rankings.
 Above the Law ranked Temple Law 43rd in its annual "Top Law Schools" report for legal employment outcomes in 2015, 2016, 2017 and 2019.
 National Law Journal ranked Temple Law as a top law best school in its annual report for 2019. The law school ranked 19th for alumni who were promoted to partnership in 2015.
 Super Lawyers ranked Temple Law as 6th in Highest Caliber Graduate and Most Prepared to Practice in 2015.
 In 2020, Temple's Pennsylvania Bar Examination passage rate was 81.3% for first time takers.

Notable alumni
 Lynne Abraham (1965), former district attorney of Philadelphia.
 Mari Carmen Aponte (1975), appointed by President Barack Obama to the position of U.S. Ambassador to El Salvador.
 Amy Banse (1987), president of Comcast Interactive Media.
 Susan Paradise Baxter (1983), judge of the United States District Court for the Western District of Pennsylvania
 Louis Bechtle (1954), judge of the United States District Court for the Eastern District of Pennsylvania
 Edward G. Biester, Jr. (1955), U.S. House of Representatives from Pennsylvania (1967–1977); Attorney General of Pennsylvania (1979–1980); judge, Bucks County Court of Common Pleas (1980–2006); U.S. Court of Military Commission Review (appointed September 2004).
 Pat Browne, Pennsylvania senator for the 16th district.
 Albert E. Burling, justice of the Supreme Court of New Jersey
 Jim Cawley, 32nd Lieutenant Governor of Pennsylvania.
 Ellen Ceisler, judge on the Commonwealth Court of Pennsylvania
 Philip Forman (1919), judge of the United States Court of Appeals for the Third Circuit, formally granted United States citizenship to Albert Einstein and Kurt Gödel
 Abraham Lincoln Freedman (1926), judge of the United States Court of Appeals for the Third Circuit
 Mitchell S. Goldberg (1986), judge on the U.S. District Court for the Eastern District of Pennsylvania.
James Henry Gorbey (1949), United States federal judge
 Clifford Scott Green, former judge on the U.S. District Court for the Eastern District of Pennsylvania.
 Martin A. Herman (1963), politician who served in the New Jersey General Assembly, where he represented the 3rd Legislative District from 1974 to 1986, and was later appointed as a judge in New Jersey Superior Court in Gloucester County.
 Herbert J. Hutton (1962), judge of the United States District Court for the Eastern District of Pennsylvania
 Melanie B. Jacobs (2002), dean of the University of Louisville School of Law 
George R. Johnson (1955), Pennsylvania State representative for the 166th district (1967–1972)
 Barbara S. Jones (1973), judge of the United States District Court for the Southern District of New York
 Kathleen Kane (1993), first female attorney general of Pennsylvania; first Democrat elected as attorney general of Pennsylvania; first incumbent attorney general of Pennsylvania to be convicted of a felony while in office.
 James McGirr Kelly (1957), judge of the United States District Court for the Eastern District of Pennsylvania
 Robert F. Kelly (1960), judge of the United States District Court for the Eastern District of Pennsylvania
 Chad F. Kenney (1980), judge of the United States District Court for the Eastern District of Pennsylvania
 Mark Levin (1980), chief of staff to Attorney General Edwin Meese and nationally syndicated radio host.
 Jose L. Linares (1978), judge of the United States District Court for the District of New Jersey.
 Mary M. Lisi (1977), judge of the United States District Court for the District of Rhode Island.
 Joseph J. Longobardi (1957), judge of the United States District Court for the District of Delaware
 John W. Lord Jr. (1928), judge of the United States District Court for the Eastern District of Pennsylvania
 Alan David Lourie (1970), judge of the United States Court of Appeals for the Federal Circuit
 Albert Branson Maris (1918), judge of the United States Court of Appeals for the Third Circuit
 Seamus McCaffrey, justice on the Supreme Court of Pennsylvania.
 James P. McGranery (1928), 61st United States Attorney General, United States Representative for Pennsylvania's 2nd District, judge of the United States District Court for the Eastern District of Pennsylvania
 Pat Meehan, former United States House of Representatives, Pennsylvania 7th District; former United States Attorney for the Eastern District of Pennsylvania.
 Cecil B. Moore,  (1951) civil rights activist, and former member of Philadelphia City Council.
 James M. Munley (1963), judge on the United States District Court for the Middle District of Pennsylvania.
 Drew O'Keefe - U.S. Attorney for the Eastern District of Pennsylvania
 John R. Padova (1959), judge of the United States District Court for the Eastern District of Pennsylvania
 Lowell A. Reed Jr. (1958), judge of the United States District Court for the Eastern District of Pennsylvania
Leon Rose, basketball sports agent.  Clients have included LeBron James and Allen Iverson.
 Allen Rosenberg, rower and rowing coach
 Timothy J. Savage (1971), judge on the United States District Court for the Eastern District of Pennsylvania.
 Martin J. Silverstein (1979), United States Ambassador to Uruguay,
Richard A. Snyder, Pennsylvania State Senator for the 13th district from 1961 to 1984
 William Henry Stafford Jr. (1956), judge of the United States District Court for the Northern District of Florida
 John F. Street (1975), former mayor of Philadelphia.
 Charles Swift (1999 L.L.M.), a lieutenant commander in the U.S. Navy, Judge Advocate General's Corps.
 Petrese B. Tucker (1976), judge on the United States District Court for the Eastern District of Pennsylvania.
 David Urban (J.D.), political commentator and lobbyist.
 Franklin S. Van Antwerpen, judge on United States Court of Appeals for the Third Circuit, former judge on the United States District Court for the Eastern District of Pennsylvania.
 James "Jim" Walden (1991), former Assistant U.S. Attorney for the Eastern District of New York and founder, Walden Macht & Haran LLP
 Charles R. Weiner (1949), judge of the United States District Court for the Eastern District of Pennsylvania
 Joseph Putnam Willson (1931), judge of the United States District Court for the Western District of Pennsylvania
Lloyd H. Wood, 20th Lieutenant Governor of Pennsylvania from 1951 to 1955

See also

 Pennsylvania Law Schools

References

External links
 Official website
 Commission on Human Relations, Brown and DeLoggio v. Temple University Law School collection at John J. Wilcox, Jr. LGBT Archives, William Way LGBT Community Center

Law schools in Pennsylvania
Temple University
Educational institutions established in 1895
1895 establishments in Pennsylvania